RU-16117 is an estrogen medication which was investigated for the potential treatment of symptoms of estrogen deficiency such as hot flashes and osteoporosis in women but was never marketed. It was developed for use by mouth.

Pharmacology

Pharmacodynamics
RU-16117 is an estrogen, or an agonist of the estrogen receptor (ER). In mouse uterine tissue, it shows about 5 to 13% of the affinity of estradiol for the ER and about 1% of the estrogenic activity of estradiol. Conversely, it shows no affinity for the androgen, progesterone, glucocorticoid, and mineralocorticoid receptors, nor any activities associated with interactions with these receptors. While the association rate of RU-16117 to the ER is the same as that of moxestrol, it dissociates from the ER extremely rapidly at rates of about three times faster than estradiol and about 20 times faster than moxestrol. This is similar to the case of estriol, which RU-16117 is described as sharing similarities with. RU-16117 is described as a weak or partial estrogen or a mixed estrogen/antiestrogen. It has been described as having highly active antiestrogenic activity with very weak uterotrophic activity. However, higher doses and/or prolonged administration of RU-16117 have been reported to induce equivalent estrogenic responses relative to estradiol and moxestrol.

Chemistry

RU-16117, also known as 11α-methoxy-17α-ethynylestradiol (11α-MeO-EE) or as 11α-methoxy-17α-ethynylestra-1,3,5(10)-triene-3,17β-diol, is a synthetic estrane steroid and a derivative of estradiol. It is specifically a derivative of ethinylestradiol (17α-ethynylestradiol) with a methoxy group at the C11α position. The compound is the C11α isomer or C11 epimer of moxestrol (11β-methoxy-17α-ethynylestradiol).

References

Abandoned drugs
Ethynyl compounds
Antiestrogens
Diols
Estranes
Ethers
Synthetic estrogens